Roderick McLeod Flett (January 26, 1873 – June 30, 1927) was a Canadian Métis ice hockey player. He was a member of the three-time Stanley Cup Champion Winnipeg Victorias. He played the point position, now known as left defence. His younger brother Magnus Flett was also a hockey player on the Winnipeg Victorias team.

Rod Flett was born in Kildonan, Manitoba in 1873 and died while golfing at the St. Charles Country Club in Winnipeg in 1927.

Awards and achievements 
Stanley Cup Championships (1896, & 1901, 1902)
“Honoured Member” of the Manitoba Hockey Hall of Fame

References
Rod Flett's biography at Manitoba Hockey Hall of Fame
Brief biography of Rod Flett

Notes

Ice hockey people from Manitoba
Winnipeg Victorias players
Canadian ice hockey defencemen
Stanley Cup champions
1873 births
1927 deaths
Métis sportspeople